Mardones is a surname. Notable people with the surname include:

Benny Mardones (1946–2020), American singer
Francisca Mardones (born 1977), Chilean wheelchair tennis player
Patricio Mardones (born 1962), Chilean footballer
Pilar Mardones (born 1989), Chilean volleyball player